Coveland is an unincorporated community on Whidbey island in Island County, in the U.S. state of Washington.

History
Coveland was laid out in 1850. The community was named for nearby Penn's Cove. A post office called Coveland was established in 1857, and remained in operation until 1881.

References

Unincorporated communities in Island County, Washington
1850 establishments in Oregon Territory
Unincorporated communities in Washington (state)